Luis Guzmán (born 9 April 1945) is a Mexican water polo player. He competed in the men's tournament at the 1968 Summer Olympics.

References

1945 births
Living people
Mexican male water polo players
Olympic water polo players of Mexico
Water polo players at the 1968 Summer Olympics
Sportspeople from Mexico City
20th-century Mexican people